or Åkrahamn (commonly known as simply Åkra) is a small town in Karmøy municipality in Rogaland county, Norway. The town is located on the west side of the island of Karmøy in the traditional district of Haugaland. The village of Veavågen lies immediately to the northeast of Åkrehamn.

The village of Åkrehamn gained town status in 2002. Since it declared town status, Åkrehamn has blossomed and is now the second largest town in the municipality of Karmøy, after Kopervik. The good economy of Norway has brought capital and investments to Åkrehamn, and in the last couple of years, the town has been expanded. Apartments and houses have been built and new fields of industry has been introduced.

The northern part of Åkrehamn now encompasses the old fishing village of Sævelandsvik.  It is centered on the nicely protected harbour area called Mannes.  The economy of this area is centered on fishing and some other small industries.

See also
List of towns and cities in Norway

References

External links
 Åkrehamns nettsted
 Åkrehamn Veksts nettsted

Karmøy
Cities and towns in Norway
Populated places in Rogaland
2002 establishments in Norway